Mörby centrum metro station is the end station on line 14 on the red line of the Stockholm metro, located by Mörby centrum shopping mall, Danderyd Municipality. The station was inaugurated on 29 January 1978 as the northern terminus of the extension from Universitetet. It is decorated by the artist Karin Ek.

References

External links
Images of Mörby centrum

Red line (Stockholm metro) stations
Railway stations opened in 1978
1978 establishments in Sweden